Gare de Basse-Indre-Saint-Herblain is a railway station serving the town Saint-Herblain, Loire-Atlantique department, western France. It is situated on the Tours–Saint-Nazaire railway, between Nantes and Savenay. It is served by local trains (TER Pays de la Loire) to Savenay and Nantes.

References

TER Pays de la Loire
Railway stations in France opened in 1857
Railway stations in Loire-Atlantique